William Saville may refer to:

William Saville (actor), in The Rocks of Valpre (1919 film)
William Saville (MP) for Reading (UK Parliament constituency)

See also
William Savile (disambiguation)
William Saville-Kent